Hesar-e Qarah Tappeh (also Romanized as Ḩeşār-e Qarah Tappeh and Ḩeşār-e Qareh Tappeh) is a village in Rahal Rural District, in the Central District of Khoy County, West Azerbaijan Province, Iran. At the 2006 census, its population was 124, in 27 families.

References 

Populated places in Khoy County